is a railway station  in the city of Minamisōma, Fukushima, Japan, operated by the East Japan Railway Company (JR East).

Lines

It's the only station of Jōban Line where Suica, as well as other IC cards in Japan, can't be used to pay fares.

Station layout
The station has a side platform and one island platform connected to the station building by a footbridge. The station is unstaffed.

Platforms

History
Momouchi Station was opened on 10 August 1948. The station was absorbed into the JR East network upon the privatization of the Japanese National Railways (JNR) on 1 April 1987. The station was closed on 11 March 2011 following the Fukushima Daiichi nuclear disaster, and reopened on 1 April 2017.

Surrounding area
former Odata Town Hall
Odaka Post Office

See also
 List of railway stations in Japan

References

External links

  

Railway stations in Fukushima Prefecture
Jōban Line
Railway stations in Japan opened in 1948
Stations of East Japan Railway Company
Minamisōma